The earliest account of Nairobi's  history dates back to 1899 when a railway depot was built in a brackish African swamp occupied by a pastoralist people, the Maasai, the sedentary Akamba people, as well as the agriculturalist Kikuyu people who were all displaced by the colonialists. The railway complex and the building around it rapidly expanded and urbanized until it became the largest city of Kenya  and the country's capital. The name Nairobi comes from the Maasai phrase , which translates to 'the place of cool waters'. However, Nairobi is popularly known as the "Green City in the Sun".

Pre-independence
The former swamp land occupied by the city now was once inhabited by a pastoralist people, the Maasai, the sedentary Akamba people, as well as the agriculturalist Kikuyu people, under the British East Africa protectorate  when the British decided to build a railroad from Mombasa to Kisumu on the edge of Lake Victoria in order to open East Africa and make it accessible for trade and encourage  colonial settlements. The Maasai were forcibly removed to allow white ranchers to use the land. The city continued to grow under British rule, and many British people settled within the city's suburbs. This continuous expansion of the city began to anger the Maasai people, as the city was devouring their land to the south. The Kikuyus were also angered and wanted the land returned to them.

In 1894, work on the railway began. A British railroad camp and supply depot for the Uganda Railway was built in the Maasai area in 1899. The location of the Nairobi railway camp was chosen due to its central position between Mombasa and Kampala, as well as  its proximity to a network of rivers that could supply the camp with water. Its elevation  made it cool enough for comfortable residential living. Furthermore, at 1661 meters above the sea level, the temperatures are too low for the  mosquitoes carrying malaria to survive.

The town was totally rebuilt in the early 1900s after an outbreak of plague and the subsequent burning down of the original town.
By 1905, Nairobi was a humming commercial center and  replaced Mombasa as capital of the British East Africa. The city expanded, supported by the growth in  administrative functions and in tourism, initially in the form of British big game hunting.  As the British colonialists explored the region, they began using Nairobi as their first stop.  This prompted the colonial government to build several grand hotels in the city for British tourists and big game hunters.

Nairobi continued to grow under  British rule, and many Britons settled within the city's suburbs.  The continuous expansion of the city began to anger the Maasai, as the city was devouring their land to the south, as well as the Kikuyu people, who felt that the land belonged to  them. In 1919, Nairobi was declared to be a municipality by the British.

In February 1926, E.A.T. Dutton passed through Nairobi on his way to Mount Kenya  and, seeing the progress and  the ambitious plans the city was making,  foresaw a city of paved roads, landscaped avenues and parks, impressive cathedrals, museums, art galleries, theatres and office buildings. He predicted that Nairobi would become a city of beauty, although he noted that much needed to be accomplished before the ambitious municipal  plan was completed and until then Nairobi would remain  "a slatternly creature, unfit to queen it over so lovely a country".

Unrest

In 1915 the British passed laws restricting the ownership of land to whites. Then followed high taxes and low wages. Blacks were forced to carry identification cards. In 1921 Harry Thuku founded the Young Kikuyu Association and began organizing protests as people became more open about their grievances against the British. On 14 March 1922 he was arrested.  His arrest caused a general strike in Nairobi in which thousands of Africans protested and the British government reacted by shooting 56 protesters, 25 of whom died,  the massacre shocking people worldwide, even the British. Although Thuku was exiled to a remote desert oasis, this was only the beginning of unrest that continued with escalating severity.

The Thuku riots reinforced a segregationist method of town planning, as a means to control the African population in Nairobi.

After the end of World War II, the friction developed into the Mau Mau Uprising.  Jomo Kenyatta, Kenya's future president, joined the Kikuyu Central Association after moving to the urban Nairobi from a small village, becoming its general secretary in three years,  a step that lead to his becoming Kenya's first prime minister and then Kenya's first president.  Pressure exerted from the local people on the British resulted in Kenyan independence in 1963, with Nairobi as the capital of the new republic.

Because the area around Nairobi continued to be a popular attraction for British big game hunters, to protect the animals the Nairobi National Park was established by Britain  in 1946, the first  national park in East Africa. It remains unique in 2008 in that it is the only game reserve bordering on a capital city in the world.

Post-independence

After independence, Nairobi grew rapidly and this growth put pressure on the city's infrastructure.  Power cuts and water shortages were a common occurrence, though in the past few years better city planning has helped to put some of these problems in check.

In 1975 Nairobi was the host city of the 5th Assembly of the World Council of Churches.

The U.S. embassy in the heart of Nairobi was bombed on 7 August 1998 by Al-Qaida, as one of a series of U.S. embassy bombings.  Over two hundred civilians were killed in the embassy and another 213 persons in the surrounding area with more than 5,000 people injured. The effects  were widespread and devastating. The embassy was completely destroyed and another forty buildings severely damaged. A seven-story building collapsed killing at least 60 people.

The growth of Nairobi has put pressure on the government to develop and maintain protected lands such as the Nairobi National Park. The new residential areas for the growing human population are making inroads into  lands that have been traditionally the migration routes for huge animal herds.

Following the disputed Kenyan presidential election, 2007, serious violence broke out in Nairobi. In the Mathare slum, Kikuyu and Luo gangs burned more than 100 homes.

On 21 September 2013, a mass shooting broke out in the luxurious Westgate shopping mall in Nairobi's Westlands neighbourhood, killing at least 68 people. The attacks were claimed by the Somalian militant group Al-Shabaab.

See also
 Timeline of Nairobi history
History of Kenya

References

Bibliography

External links
More About Nairobi Kenya 
More About Kenya & Nairobi Kenya 
Nairobi - Kenya's Capital City